Pehchaan, is a Pakistani television drama serial that aired on A-Plus TV from 17 April 2014 to 4 September 2014. It was written by Bee Gul and directed by Khalid Ahmed. It stars Alishba Yousuf, Sohail Sameer and Iffat Rahim in lead roles.

Plot overview 
Pehchaan is the narrative of Laila, a praiseworthy young girl having a basic existence with no more prominent assumptions separated from discovering love in her arranged marriage, finds her genuine strength and a solid way of life as an independent woman when gotten through the trial of time and relations. Will the society let her discover the equality that she properly merits and the love she has consistently yearned for?

Cast 
 Alishba Yousuf as Laila
 Sohail Sameer as Mansoor
 Iffat Rahim as Kukoo
 Anita Camphor as Mrs. Khan
 Qazi Wajid as Laila's father
 Parveen Malik as Laila's mother
 Fawad Khan as Khurram
 Faris Khalid as Saadi
 Sumbul Shahid as Kukoo's mother

Reception 
Being an artistic serial and having unique storyline, the series received praise from critics. Masala.com said it "an underrated show". Dawn praised the writing and execution of the serial and wrote, "The non-linear script is beautifully handled and the excellent visuals help make Pehchan a serial that is as appealing as it is engaging." The newspaper further adds, "Writer Bee Gul and director Khalid Ahmed, who gave us Talkhian, produced another gem in Pehchaan."

References

Urdu-language television shows
Pakistani drama television series
2010s Pakistani television series